The 2000–01 Football League Cup (known as the Worthington Cup for sponsorship reasons) was the 41st staging of the Football League Cup, a knockout competition for England's top 92 football clubs.

The competition began on 22 August 2000, and ended with the final on 25 February 2001 at the Millennium Stadium in Cardiff as Wembley Stadium had been closed for a rebuild.

The tournament was won by Liverpool, who beat Birmingham City 5–4 on penalties after a 1–1 draw after extra-time. Robbie Fowler put Liverpool in front after half an hour but a Darren Purse penalty salvaged the game for Birmingham in the final minute of normal time.

This edition was the last with two-legged ties in the first two rounds.

First round
The 70 First, Second and Third Division clubs compete from the First Round. Each section is divided equally into a pot of seeded clubs and a pot of unseeded clubs. Clubs' rankings depend upon their finishing position in the 1999–2000 season. Therefore, the 20th place from the Premier League in 2000, Watford was the top seed, and the club newly promoted to the Third Division, Kidderminster Harriers, were bottom seeds. The first legs took place on 22 and 23 August and the second legs on 5 and 6 September.

Second round
The 35 winners from the First Round joined the Premier League clubs not participating in European competition along with Wimbledon and Sheffield Wednesday, the top two relegated teams from Premier League the last season. The ties were played over two legs, with the first legs from 19 to 20 September and the second legs on 26 and 27 September. Two second leg matches were played on 2 October.

Third round
The 25 winners from the Second Round joined the Premier League clubs participating in European competition in Round Three. Matches were played on 31 October and 1 November.

Fourth round
The eight matches were played on 28 and 29 November.

Fifth round
The four matches were played on 12, 13 and 19 December.

Semi-finals
The semi-final draw was made in December 2000 after the conclusion of the quarter finals. Unlike the other rounds, the semi-final ties were played over two legs, with each team playing one leg at home. The first legs were played on 9 and 10 January and the second legs on 24 and 31 January 2001.

First leg

Second leg

Liverpool win 6–2 on aggregate.

Birmingham City win 4–2 on aggregate

Final

The 2001 Worthington Cup Final was played on 25 February 2001 and was contested between First Division side Birmingham City and Premier League team Liverpool at the Millennium Stadium, Cardiff. Liverpool won the game 5–4 on penalties following a 1–1 draw after extra time. 

Liverpool win 5–4 penalties

References

External links
Official Carling Cup website
Carling Cup at bbc.co.uk
League Cup news, match reports and pictures on Reuters.co.uk
Results on Soccerbase

EFL Cup seasons
Cup, 2000–01